The men's single sculls competition at the 1996 Summer Olympics took place at Lake Lanier, Atlanta, United States of America. The event was held from 21 to 27 July 1996. There were 21 competitors from 21 nations, with each nation limited to a single boat in the event. The event was won by Xeno Müller of Switzerland, the nation's first victory in the event and first medal of any color since 1960. Derek Porter's silver was Canada's best-ever result in the event, over bronze medals in 1912 and 1984. Two-time defending champion Thomas Lange of Germany settled with a bronze medal this time, becoming the fourth man to win three medals in the event.

Background

This was the 22nd appearance of the event. Rowing had been on the programme in 1896 but was cancelled due to bad weather. The single sculls has been held every time that rowing has been contested, beginning in 1900.

Five of the 22 single scullers from the 1992 Games returned: two-time gold medalist Thomas Lange of Germany, silver medalist Václav Chalupa of Czechoslovakia (now representing the Czech Republic), fifth-place finisher Jüri Jaanson of Estonia, sixth-place finisher Sergio Fernández González of Argentina, and thirteenth-place finisher Massimo Marconcini of Italy. The field was strong with no clear favorite. There were four World Champions competing in Atlanta: Lange (1987 and 1989), Jaanson (1990), Derek Porter of Canada (1993), and Iztok Čop of Slovenia (reigning, 1995). Chalupa was a four-time World silver medalist along with his 1992 Olympic silver. Fernández González was the reigning Pan American champion. Lange, Xeno Müller of Switzerland, and Jaanson had won the Diamond Challenge Sculls in 1993, 1994, and 1995, respectively. 

The Czech Republic, Hong Kong, Russia, Slovenia, and Ukraine each made their debut in the event. The United States made its 18th appearance, most among nations.

Competition format

This rowing event was a single scull event, meaning that each boat was propelled by a single rower. The "scull" portion means that the rower used two oars, one on each side of the boat. The course used the 2000 metres distance that became the Olympic standard in 1912. 

The tournament used the four-round format (three main rounds and a repechage) that had been used since 1968. The competition continued to use the six-boat heat standardized in 1960. The use of multiple classes of semifinals and finals to rank every boat, introduced in 1992, continued as well.

 Quarterfinals: Four heats of 5 or 6 boats each. The top boat in each heat (4 total) advanced directly to the "A/B" semifinals. The remaining boats (17 total) went to the repechage.
 Repechage: Four heats of 4 or 5 boats each. The top two boats in each heat (8 total) rejoined the quarterfinal winners in the "A/B" semifinals. The other boats (9 total) went to the "C/D" semifinals, where they were no longer competing for medals.
 Semifinals: Four semifinals. Two "A/B" semifinals of 6 boats each for boats still in contention for medals; the top three boats in each heat (6 total) advanced to Final A, the remaining boats (6 total) went to Final B. Two "C/D" semifinals were used to sort remaining boats into ranking finals with no chance of medals; the top three boats in each heat (6 total) went to Final C while the remaining boats (3 total) went to Final D.
 Final: Four finals. Final A consisted of the top 6 boats. Final B placed boats 7 through 12. Final C placed boats 13 through 18. Final D placed boats 19 through 21.

Schedule

All times are Eastern Daylight Time (UTC-4)

Results

Quarterfinals

The winner in each heat advanced directly to Semifinals A/B. The remaining rowers competed in the repechage for the remaining spots in the semifinals.

Quarterfinal 1

Quarterfinal 2

Quarterfinal 3

Quarterfinal 4

Repechage

The first two rowers in each race advanced to Semifinals A/B, the rest went to Semifinals C/D.

Repechage heat 1

Repechage heat 2

Repechage heat 3

Repechage heat 4

Semifinals

Rowers competing in Semifinals A/B were the rowers who still have chance to win medal in Final A. The first three rowers from each semifinal advanced to Final A, while the others advanced to Final B. On the other hand, rowers competing in Semifinals C/D were the rowers who were already eliminated from the medal race. The first three rowers from these semifinals advanced to Final C and the others to Final D.

Semifinal C/D 1

Semifinal C/D 2

Semifinal A/B 1

Semifinal A/B 2

Finals

Final D

Final C

Final B

Final A

Results summary

References

External links

Rowing at the 1996 Summer Olympics
Men's events at the 1996 Summer Olympics